Joo Yea-na (born 5 February 1990) is a South Korean female professional volleyball player.

She was part of the team at the Asian Women's U19 Volleyball Championship, and 2011 FIVB Volleyball Women's World Cup.

Clubs
Heungkuk life Insurance (2011)

References

External links
 Player info FIVB

1990 births
Living people
South Korean women's volleyball players